Jakhan Choto Chilam (English meaning-When I was a kid) is a 1982 autobiographical book by the famed film director Satyajit Ray. In this book, Ray discusses his childhood days in the city of Kolkata (then Calcutta), India from eyes of an everyday boy.

References

1982 non-fiction books
Indian autobiographies
Books by Satyajit Ray